Music Theory Online is a quarterly peer-reviewed open access academic journal covering music theory and analysis. It was established in 1993 and is published by the Society for Music Theory. The initial issues were designated as part of volume 0. Volume 1 began in January 1995. Its founding editor-in-chief was Lee A. Rothfarb. The journal is abstracted and indexed in the Répertoire International de Littérature Musicale.

External links 
 

Music theory journals
Publications established in 1993
English-language journals
Open access journals
Quarterly journals